Lusby's Mill is an unincorporated community in northern Owen County, Kentucky, United States. It is located six miles east of Owenton on Kentucky Route 330.

History

The area was originally settled by the Cobb family and a mill was built by William Jones for the family. Around 1852 the mill was acquired by John or William Lusby. There was a post office that operated in Lusby's Mill from 1852 to 1904 and the town was incorporated in 1869. During the Civil War a Confederate training camp, Camp Humphrey was here. One of the oldest houses in town is the Gunboat House, which received its name during the Civil War. There was a distillery that was said to produce “fine quality of pure old copper distilled whiskey” which closed in 1897. In 1871, the Lusby's Mill Bridge, a 140-foot covered bridge, was built, but was destroyed by fire in 1927. The town had a population of 81 as of the 1880 census. Margaret Hammon donated the land for the first school in town, and the Lusby Central High School operated until 1934. After a bypass road was constructed, business activity diminished in the settlement, and it is no longer incorporated.

Notable people
The poet Perry Jones was from Lusby's Mill.

References

External links
 Lusby's Mill

Unincorporated communities in Kentucky
Unincorporated communities in Owen County, Kentucky